Benzothiadiazole  may refer to:

 Acibenzolar-S-methyl
 1,2,3-Benzothiadiazole
 2,1,3-Benzothiadiazole